1899 in philosophy

Events

Publications 
 Sigmund Freud, The Interpretation of Dreams (1899)
 Thorstein Veblen, The Theory of the Leisure Class (1899)
 Heinrich Rickert, Kulturwissenschaft und Naturwissenschaft (1899)

Philosophical literature 
 Joseph Conrad, Heart of Darkness (1899)

Births 
 May 8 - Friedrich Hayek (died 1992)
 September 20 - Leo Strauss (died 1973)

Deaths

References 

Philosophy
19th-century philosophy
Philosophy by year